Yassin Nasser (born 25 February 2000) is a Dutch professional footballer who plays as a forward or an attacking midfielder for Derde Divisie club Blauw Geel and the Netherlands national team.

Early life
Born in Veghel, Nasser grew up playing football from the age of five with his local club. Simons is of Moroccon descent through his father.

Club career

Early career
Nasser joined PSV Eindhoven in 2009 from his local club Blauw Geel which is located in his birthplace Veghel, Netherlands.

Jong Utrecht

FK Skopje

Blauw Geel

References

External links
 

2000 births
Living people
Dutch footballers
Dutch expatriate footballers
Association football forwards
PSV Eindhoven players
Lierse S.K. players
FC Utrecht players
Jong FC Utrecht players
Eerste Divisie players
Dutch expatriate sportspeople in Belgium
Expatriate footballers in Belgium
Dutch sportspeople of Moroccan descent